Caoilinn Hughes is an Irish novelist, and short story writer.

Life
She holds BA and MA degrees from Queen's University of Belfast, and a PhD in English Literature from Victoria University of Wellington, New Zealand. Her poetry collection, Gathering Evidence (Carcanet, 2014), won the Irish Times Shine/Strong Award in 2015. Her debut novel, Orchid & the Wasp (Oneworld / Hogarth, 2018), won the 2019 Collyer Bristow Prize, was shortlisted for the Hearst Big Book Award and the Butler Literary Award, and was longlisted for the Authors' Club Best First Novel Award and the International Dublin Literary Award 2020. In 2018, she won The Moth Short Story Prize for her story Psychobabble. In 2019 she won an O. Henry Award for her short story Prime. She won the An Post Irish Book Awards' writing.ie Story of the Year 2020. Her second novel, The Wild Laughter (Oneworld 2020), won the Royal Society of Literature's Encore Award 2021, and was shortlisted for the An Post Irish Book Awards' Novel of the Year 2020, the RTÉ Radio 1 Listeners' Choice Award, the Dalkey Literary Award (Emerging Writer), and was longlisted for the 2021 Dylan Thomas Prize. She is the 2021 Writer Fellow at Trinity College Dublin.

Works
 The Wild Laughter, Oneworld Publications, 2020. 
 Orchid And The Wasp, Oneworld Publications/Hogarth Press, 2018. , 
 Gathering Evidence, Carcanet Press, 2014. ,

References

External links
 Times Literary Supplement review of The Wild Laughter
 Sunday Independent review of The Wild Laughter
 Irish Times interview with Caoilinn Hughes
 Bristol 24/7 interview with Caoilinn Hughes
 Tin House Magazine Interview: Caoilinn Hughes
 Collyer Prize Prize 2019 - winner announcement

Year of birth missing (living people)
Living people
Irish women novelists
Irish women poets
Irish women short story writers
Alumni of Queen's University Belfast
Victoria University of Wellington alumni
21st-century Irish novelists
21st-century Irish poets
21st-century Irish short story writers
21st-century Irish women writers